Flowrence Jematiah Sergon is a Kenyan politician who has been a member of the National Assembly since 2022. In 2017 she was elected a member of the East African Legislative Assembly (ELEA).

Life
Flowrence Jematiah was educated at Marigat Secondary School in Baringo County, where she was head girl. She then trained at the Kenya Medical Training College. Moving into politics, she worked for the defunct United Republican Party and then became coordinator of the Jubilee Party's campaigns in Baringo, Nakuru and Elgeyo-Marakwet.

Nominated by the Jubilee Party for the East African Legislative Assembly, she was elected to be a member of the ELEA with 252 votes. She is the youngest of Kenya's nine representatives to the ELEA.

She was elected women's representative in the National Assembly from Baringo County in the 2022 general election for the United Democratic Alliance.

References

External links
 Sergon Jematiah Florence

Year of birth missing (living people)
Living people
Jubilee Party politicians
21st-century Kenyan women politicians
21st-century Kenyan politicians
Members of the East African Legislative Assembly
Members of the 13th Parliament of Kenya
Kenyan women representatives
People from Baringo County
United Democratic Alliance (Kenya) politicians